Kennedy is a Railway point and unincorporated place in geographic Talbott Township, Algoma District in Northeastern Ontario, Canada. The community is counted as part of Unorganized Algoma North Part in Canadian census data.

Kennedy is on the Algoma Central Railway, between the communities of Norris to the south and Hale to the north, and has a passing track.

References

Other map sources:

Communities in Algoma District